This is a list of medalists from the ICF Canoe Slalom World Championships in men's kayak.

K1
Debuted: 1949. The event was folding from 1949 to 1963

Medal table

K1 team
Debuted: 1949. The event was folding from 1949 to 1963.

Medal table

Extreme K1
Debuted: 2017

Medal table

References
World Championship results archive